"With One Exception" is a song written by Billy Sherrill and Glenn Sutton, and recorded by American country music artist David Houston.  It was released in March 1967 as the third single from the album A Loser's Cathedral.  The song was Houston's second number one on the country charts.  The single stayed at number one for a single week and spent a total of fifteen weeks on the chart.

Chart performance

References

1967 singles
David Houston (singer) songs
Songs written by Billy Sherrill
Songs written by Glenn Sutton
Song recordings produced by Billy Sherrill
Epic Records singles
1967 songs